Marco Zanini (born 1971) is an Italian fashion designer. He is most noted for serving as creative director of the House of Schiaparelli in 2014, overseeing the couture fashion house's first runway show since its closure in 1954. This came after having led the successful revival at Halston and Rochas.

Career
After graduating from Nuova Accademia di Belle Arti in 2005, Zanini went on to work as Lawrence Steele's first assistant.

References

Fashion designers from Milan
Italian expatriates in France
1971 births
Living people
21st-century American businesspeople